Abakano-Perevoz is a rural locality (a selo) in Troitsky Selsoviet of Bogradsky District, Russia. The population was 149 as of 2018. There are 14 streets.

Geography 
Abakano-Perevoz is located 33 km east of Bograd (the district's administrative centre) by road. Troitskoye is the nearest rural locality.

References 

Rural localities in Khakassia